Aranlı (known as Poltavka until 1999) is a village and municipality in the Imishli District of Azerbaijan. It has a population of 3,626.

References

Populated places in Imishli District